The Kommando Landstreitkräfte (short: Kdo LaSK or Kommando LaSK) was the Army staff — and simultaneously the Army command of the National People's Army (NPA) Land Forces of the former GDR.

History 
On 1 December 1972 the Kommando LaSK was established under the command of LG Horst Stechbarth as independent Army Staff, and Main Army Command of the Land Forces, a Military branch of the GDR National People's Army. As HQ served the former barracks of the Oberkommando der Luftwaffe, built by Ernst Sagebiel in 1936, and located in the area of the Wildpark Potsdam.

It was disbanded together with the NPA in 1990. The legal successor became the Bundeswehrkommando Ost under LG Jörg Schönbohm.  Today the “Einsatzführungskommando of the Bundeswehr“ is stationed in this Barracks.

Command and Organization

Command, Control, and Communications 
The main task of the NPA Army Command was to provide Command, Control and Communications (C3) to the military branch as the whole, as well as to the subordinated corps-sized commands, officer's high schools, groups, organizations, and units of the NPA's Land Forces.

Under deployment conditions,  and in line with the situation awareness C3 had to be executed from the Component Headquarters in Geltow, Field Component Headquarters or Operations Centers.

Commanding generals of the NPA Army Command 
Source:

 Remark
The commanding general was competent, mandated and authorized to provide tasks and orders direct to the subordinated deputies. He was assisted by a so-called Militärrat of the Army Command, the highest HQ advisory body on deputy level.

Organization 
The command was composed by the following establishment:

 Deputy Minister and Commander-in-chief Army (3 star level) with the military advisor

 Deputy of the Commander Army Command (DC Army Command) and Chief of the Political Division (2 star level) with
 Three branches including Chief Party Control Commission (de: PKK), Central Party Leadership (de: ZPL), Spec-Propaganda, and Political Branch of the Kdo LSK/LV

 DC Army Command and Chief of Staff (CS) (2 star level)  with
 Assistant Chief Of Staff (ACOS) and G3 (1 star level) with
 Branch 1
 Branch 2

 ACOS and Chief General Tasks with
 Staff company, guard company and vehicle company

 Chief G1 with PTA and WTA
 Chief Organization/Replenishment with
 Branch Organization
 Branch Replenishment

 Chief RECON

 Chief General-Military Training and Schools (de: AMAS)

 Chief G6 with
 Branches 1, 2 and 8th section

 Chief Mil Scientific (de: MiWi)

 Chief Chemical Services (de: CD)

 DC Army and Chief G4 (de. RD) (2 star level) with
 AC and CS G4 (1 Star level)
 Chief Medical Service
 Chief Combat Engineer Service
 Chief Military Architecture Accommodation (de: MBU)
 Chief Military Transport (de: MTW)
 Chief Closing and Equipment (de: BA)

 Chief SAM Forces (de. FRT)
 Chief Army Aviation
 Military prosecutor
 Division 2000 - Here the branch G2 with responsibility to the military branch Land Forces of the National People's Army

Furthermore generals of the NPA Army Command

Subordinated commands, forces, units, and organizations
The following units and commands reported directly to NPA Land Forces Command: 

 Military District Command III (de: Kommando Militärbezirk III, Kdo. MB-III) with headquarters
 Military District Command V (de: Kommando Militärbezirk V, Kdo. MB-V) with headquarters
 40th Field Artillery Brigade (de: 40. Artilleriebrigade, 40. ABr)
 40th Technical Training Center (de: Ausbildungs-Technisches Zentrum 40, ATZ-40)
 40th Parachute Training Base (de: Fallschirmjägerausbildungsbasis, FJABas-40)
 Air defence missile training center 40 (de: Fla-Raketenausbildungszentrum 40, FRAZ-40)
 40th Multiple rocket launcher battalion (de: Geschoßwerferabteilung 40, GeWA-40)
 40th Cnstruction engineering battalion  (de: Ingenieurbaubataillon 40, IBB-40)
 Luftsturmregiment 40
 Miltaty technical school of the Land forces "Erich Habersaath"
 40th Signal battalion (de: Nachrichtenbataillon 40, NB-40)
 Land forces Officer Cadet School "Ernst Thälmann"
 Foreign Military Officers Training School (de: Offiziershochschule für ausländische Militärkader "Otto Winzer")
 Engineer construction battalion 40 (de: Pionierbaubataillon 40, PiBB-40)
 40th center for missile forces training (de: Raketenausbildungszentrum 40, RAZ-40)
 40th Support and Garrison Battalion (de: Wach- und Sicherstellungsbataillon 40, WSB-40)

Notes

References 
 Torsten Diedrich (Hrsg./Bearbeiter im Auftr. des Militärgeschichtlichen Forschungsamtes): Handbuch der bewaffneten Organe der DDR. Weltbild, Augsburg 2004, .

National army headquarters
1970 establishments in East Germany
1990 disestablishments in East Germany
Military units and formations established in 1972
Military units and formations disestablished in 1990